David Munzni (3 October 1924 – 3 December 1987) was an Indian politician. He was a Member of Parliament, representing Lohardaga, Bihar in the Lok Sabha the lower house of India's Parliament as a member of the Indian National Congress. Munzi died in Delhi on 3 December 1987, at the age of 63.

References

External links
Official biographical sketch in Parliament of India website

1924 births
1987 deaths
Lok Sabha members from Bihar
India MPs 1962–1967
Indian National Congress politicians
Indian National Congress politicians from Bihar